Club Deportivo Huracán Z is a Spanish football team based in Trobajo del Camino, town belonging to San Andrés del Rabanedo municipality, in the autonomous community of Castile and León. Founded in 1954, it plays in Primera Regional, holding home games at Estadio Municipal Rafa Tejerina, with a capacity of 500 seats.

Season to season

8 seasons in Tercera División

Notable former players
 Addison Alves

Notable former managers
 Luis Cembranos

External links
elportaldelfutbol.es.tl profile 
Futbolme.com profile 

Football clubs in Castile and León
Association football clubs established in 1954
Divisiones Regionales de Fútbol clubs
1954 establishments in Spain
Province of León